In enzymology, a 1,3-alpha-L-fucosidase is an enzyme that catalyzes the chemical reaction of cleaving the 1,3-linkages between alpha-L-fucose and N-acetylglucosamine residues in glycoproteins.

This enzyme belongs to the family of hydrolases, specifically those glycosidases that hydrolyse O- and S-glycosyl compounds.  The systematic name of this enzyme class is 3-alpha-L-fucosyl-N-acetylglucosaminyl-glycoprotein fucohydrolase. This enzyme is also called almond emulsin fucosidase I.  This enzyme participates in the degradation of glycan structures.

References

 
 
 

EC 3.2.1
Enzymes of unknown structure